The Bishop-33 opening (3三角 san-san kaku) is an opening characterized by moving the bishop to the 33 square early while leaving the bishop diagonal opening allowing for an early bishop trade. The opening is flexible in that it can lead to an Opposing Rook (Ranging Rook) position as well as a Static Rook position with or without a bishop trade.

The most common variation and the one used by some professional players is the Fourth Move Bishop-33 opening (４手目３三角戦法 yon-teme san-san kaku senpō). When used by Black, this is known as Third Move Bishop-77 opening (３手目７七角戦法 san-teme nana-nana kaku senpō).

Fourth Move Bishop-33

1. P-76 P-34, 2. P-26.

2...B-33. White's bishop moves to the 33 square on the fourth move of the game keeping their bishop diagonal open. 

This move invites Black to capture the bishop which is only defended by White's left knight.

Black capturing the bishop

See also

 Opposing Rook
 Ranging Rook

Bibliography

 藤井, 猛. 2008. 相振り飛車を指しこなす本 (Vol. 3). 浅川書房.
 藤井, 猛. 2008. 相振り飛車を指しこなす本 (Vol. 4). 浅川書房.
 窪田, 義行. 2008. 変幻自在!!: 窪田流３三角戦法. 毎日コミュニケーションズ.

External links

 Yamajunn's Basic Shogi Opening: Yonteme San-San Kaku Senpou
 Yamajunn's Shogi Opening Traps: 
 Yonteme San-San Kaku, Part 1
 Yonteme San-San Kaku, Part 2
 将棋・序盤のStrategy: 
 後手４手目△３三角の序盤戦術表 
 先手３手目▲７七角の序盤戦術表 

Shogi openings
Ranging Rook openings
Opposing Rook openings